Rudkhaneh may refer to:
Rudkhaneh, Gilan
Rudkhaneh, Hormozgan
Rudkhaneh, Isfahan
Rudkhaneh, Kerman
Rudkhaneh-ye Kemal, Kerman Province
Rudkhaneh-ye Soltani, Kerman Province
Rudkhaneh, Jiroft, Kerman Province
Rudkhaneh, Razavi Khorasan
Rudkhaneh District, in Hormozgan Province